Ab Zalu may refer to:
 Ab Zalu, Fars
 Ab Zalu, Andika, Khuzestan Province
 Abzalu, Izeh County, Khuzestan Province
 Ab Zalu-ye Arab, Masjed Soleyman County, Khuzestan Province
 Ab Zalu-ye Bahram, Masjed Soleyman County, Khuzestan Province
 Ab Zalu, Kohgiluyeh and Boyer-Ahmad
 Ab Zalu-ye Olya-ye Neqareh Khaneh, Kohgiluyeh and Boyer-Ahmad Province
 Ab Zalu-ye Sofla-ye Neqareh Khaneh, Kohgiluyeh and Boyer-Ahmad Province
 Ab Zalu-ye Vosta-ye Neqareh Khaneh, Kohgiluyeh and Boyer-Ahmad Province

See also
 Ab Zehlu (disambiguation)